New Communist Party may refer to:

New Communist Party of Britain
New Communist Party of the Netherlands
New Communist Party of Georgia
New Communist Party of Yugoslavia